The 2016 ADAC Zurich 24 Hours of Nürburgring was the 44th running of the 24 Hours of Nürburgring. It took place over 26–29 May 2016.

The #4 AMG-Team Black Falcon won the race on a Mercedes-AMG GT3.

Race results
Class winners in bold.

References

External links

 2016 24 Hours of Nürburgring official results

Nürburgring 24 Hours
2016 in German motorsport
May 2016 sports events in Germany